Melbourne East Province was an electorate of the Victorian Legislative Council.

It was created in June 1904 when Melbourne Province was reduced in size (four members down to two), North Yarra Province and South Yarra Province were abolished. The new Melbourne East Province, Melbourne North Province, Melbourne South Province and Melbourne West Province were then created.

Melbourne East was defined by the Electoral Provinces Boundaries Act 1903 (taking effect from the 1904 elections) as consisting of the following divisions: Barkly, Central Fitzroy, Central Richmond, Collingwood East, Darling, North Richmond, South Fitzroy and South Richmond.

Melbourne East was abolished soon after the new Doutta Galla, Higinbotham and Monash Provinces were created in 1937.

Members for Melbourne East Province
These were members of the upper house province of the Victorian Parliament. The bicameral system of government commenced in November 1856.

 = Resigned

Pitt transferred from North Yarra Province in 1904.
McNamara transferred to Melbourne Province in June 1937.

References

Former electoral provinces of Victoria (Australia)
1904 establishments in Australia
1940 disestablishments in Australia